Gatina may refer to:

 Gatina, Kenya
 Gatina, Slovenia